Free improvisation or free music is improvised music without any rules beyond the logic or inclination of the musician(s) involved. The term can refer to both a technique (employed by any musician in any genre) and as a recognizable genre in its own right.

Free improvisation, as a genre of music, developed primarily in the U.K. as well as the U.S. and Europe in the mid to late 1960s, largely as an outgrowth of free jazz and modern classical musics. Exponents of free improvised music include saxophonists Evan Parker, Anthony Braxton, Peter Brötzmann, and John Zorn, composer Pauline Oliveros, drummer Christian Lillinger, trombonist George E. Lewis, guitarists Derek Bailey, Henry Kaiser and Fred Frith and the improvising groups Spontaneous Music Ensemble, The Music Improvisation Company, Iskra 1903, The Art Ensemble of Chicago and AMM.

Characteristics 
In an atonal context, free improvisation refers to where the focus shifts from harmony to other dimensions of music: timbre, melodic intervals, rhythm and the spontaneous interaction between musicians. Although performers may choose to play in a certain style or key, or at a certain tempo, conventional songs are highly uncommon in free improvisation; more emphasis is generally placed on mood, texture or more simply, on performative gesture than on preset forms of melody, harmony or rhythm. These elements are improvised at will, as the music progresses.

John Eyles notes that guitarist Derek Bailey has been quoted as saying that free improvisation is "playing without memory".

In his landmark book Improvisation, Bailey writes, "The lack of precision over its [free improv's] naming is, if anything, increased when we come to the thing itself. Diversity is its most consistent characteristic. It has no stylistic or idiomatic commitment. It has no prescribed idiomatic sound. The characteristics of freely improvised music are established only by the sonic musical identity of the person or persons playing it."

Free music performers, coming from a disparate variety of backgrounds, often engage musically with other genres. For example, acclaimed soundtrack composer Ennio Morricone was a member of the free improvisation group Nuova Consonanza. Anthony Braxton has written opera, and John Zorn has written acclaimed orchestral pieces.

As it has influenced and been influenced by other areas of exploration, aspects of modern classical music (extended techniques), noise rock (aggressive confrontation and dissonance), IDM (computer manipulation and digital synthesis), minimalism and electroacoustic music can now be heard in free improvisation.

History 
Though there are many important precedents and developments, free improvisation developed gradually, making it difficult to pinpoint a single moment when the style was born. Free improvisation primarily descends from the Indeterminacy movement and free jazz. British musical trio, Joseph Holbrooke, consisting of guitarist Derek Bailey, drummer Tony Oxley, and bassist Gavin Bryars are considered to be one of the earliest and most influential artists in the genre.

Bailey contends that free improvisation must have been the earliest musical style, because "mankind's first musical performance couldn't have been anything other than a free improvisation." Similarly, Keith Rowe stated, "Other players got into playing freely, way before AMM, way before Derek [Bailey]! Who knows when free playing started? You can imagine lute players in the 1500s getting drunk and doing improvisations for people in front of a log fire.. the noise, the clatter must have been enormous. You read absolutely incredible descriptions of that. I cannot believe that musicians back then didn't float off into free playing. The melisma in Monterverdi  must derive from that. But it was all in the context of a repertoire."

At the same time, Free Improvisation is a problematic term. It is neither free nor improvised as in their strict definitions. Musicians who play free improvisation develop highly individualized musical vocabulary which are then played without the restriction of a score. In this sense, the freedom implied by the term Free Improvisation is more of an aesthetic of playing towards notions of freedom than freedom in the pure sense.

Classical precedents 
By the middle decades of the 20th century, composers like Henry Cowell, Earle Brown, David Tudor, La Monte Young, Jackson Mac Low, Morton Feldman, Sylvano Bussotti, Karlheinz Stockhausen, and George Crumb, re-introduced improvisation to European art music, with compositions that allowed or even required musicians to improvise. One notable example of this is Cornelius Cardew's Treatise: a graphic score with no conventional notation whatsoever, which musicians were invited to interpret. 

Improvisation is still commonly practised by some organists at concerts or church services, and courses in improvisation (including free improvisation) are part of many higher education programmes for church musicians. Notable contemporary organists include Olivier Latry and Jean Guillou. Free improvisations for organ has also occasionally been recorded and released on albums, such as Like a Flame by Frederik Magle.

Jazz precedents 

Improvisation has been a central element of jazz since the music's inception, but until the 1950s, such improvisation was typically clearly within the jazz idiom and based on prescribed traditions.

Perhaps the earliest free recordings in jazz are two pieces recorded under the leadership of jazz pianist Lennie Tristano: "Intuition", and "Digression", both recorded in 1949 with a quintet including saxophone players Lee Konitz and Warne Marsh. In 1954 Shelly Manne recorded a piece called "Abstract No. 1" with trumpeter Shorty Rogers and reedsmith Jimmy Giuffre which was freely improvised. Jazz critic Harvey Pekar has also pointed out that one of Django Reinhardt's recorded improvisations strays drastically from the chord changes of the established piece. While noteworthy, these examples were clearly in the jazz idiom.

In the late 1950s and early 1960s, the free jazz movement coalesced around such important (and disparate) figures as Cecil Taylor, Sun Ra, Ornette Coleman, and John Coltrane, as well as many lesser-known figures such as Joe Maneri and Joe Harriott. Free jazz allowed for radical improvised departures from the harmonic and rhythmic material of the composition – for instance, by permitting performers to ignore conventional repeating song-structures. Such music often seemed far removed from the preceding jazz tradition, even though it almost always preserved one or more central elements of that tradition while abandoning others.

These ideas were extended in the 1962 Free Fall recording by jazz clarinetist Jimmy Giuffre's trio, featuring music that was often freely and spontaneously improvised, and which had only tenuous similarity to established jazz styles. Another important recording was New York Eye and Ear Control (1964), a soundtrack for a film by Michael Snow, recorded for the ESP-Disk label under the leadership of saxophonist Albert Ayler. Snow suggested to Ayler that the band simply play without a composition or themes.

The Spontaneous Music Ensemble was formed by John Stevens and Trevor Watts in the mid-1960s and included, at various times, influential players such as Derek Bailey, Evan Parker, Kenny Wheeler, Roger Smith, and John Butcher. As with the Association for the Advancement of Creative Musicians (AACM), many of these players began in jazz, but gradually pushed the music into a zone of abstraction and relative quietude. The British record label Emanem has documented much music in this vein.

There was (and continues to be) often considerable blurring of the line between free jazz and free improvisation.  The Chicago-based AACM, a loose collective of improvising musicians including Muhal Richard Abrams, Henry Threadgill, Anthony Braxton, Jack DeJohnette, Lester Bowie, Roscoe Mitchell, Joseph Jarman, Famadou Don Moye, Malachi Favors and George E. Lewis was formed in 1965 and included many of the key players in the nascent international free improv scene. (Braxton recorded many times with Bailey and Teitelbaum; Mitchell recorded with Thomas Buckner and Pauline Oliveros.)

International free improvisation 
Through the remainder of the 1960s and through the 1970s, free improvisation spread across the U.S., Europe and East Asia, entering quickly into a dialogue with Fluxus, happenings, performance art and rock music.

By the mid-1970s, free improvisation was truly a worldwide phenomenon.

In 1976 Derek Bailey founded and curated Company Week, the first of an annual series of improvised music festivals in which Bailey programmed performances by ad hoc ensembles of musicians who in many cases had never played with each other before. This musical chairs approach to collaboration was a characteristically provocative gesture by Bailey, perhaps in response to John Stevens' claim that musicians needed to collaborate for months or years in order to improvise well together. The final Company Week was in 1994.

Since 2002 New Zealand collective Vitamin S has hosted weekly improvisations based around randomly drawn trios.  Vitamin S takes the form beyond music and includes improvisers from other forms such as dance, theatre and puppetry.

Since 2006, improvisational music in many forms has been supported and promoted by ISIM, the International Society for Improvised Music, founded by Ed Sarath of the University of Michigan and Sarah Weaver. ISIM comprises some 300 performing artists and scholars worldwide, including Pauline Oliveros, Oliver Lake, Thomas Buckner, Robert Dick, India Cooke, Jane Ira Bloom, Karlton Hester, Roman Stolyar, Mark Dresser, and many others.

Founded in Manchester, England, in 2007, the Noise Upstairs has been an institution dedicated to the practice of improvised music, hosting regular concerts and creative workshops where they have promoted international and UK-based artists such as Ken Vandermark, Lê Quan Ninh, Ingrid Laubrock, Beats & Pieces Big Band, and Yuri Landman.  On top of these events, the Noise Upstairs runs monthly jam nights, the premise being that anyone can turn up and join in by putting their name in the hat and trios are chosen at random to freely improvise together. These jam session also include a set from special guests which have included many international musicians such as Jason Kahn, Sonia Paço-Rocchia, Daniele Ledda, Helmut Lemke and Christine Sehnaoui, as well as top UK improvisers Mick Beck, Phil Marks, Pete Fairclough, Shatner's Bassoon, Anton Hunter, Rodrigo Constanzo, Johnny Hunter, Martin Archer, Sam Andreae, Seth Bennett, John Jasnoch and Charlie Collins, among many more.

Other groups such as the 1984ensemble, which was formed in 2013 by trombonist Kris T Reeder in Oxford, featuring musicians from the Oxford Improvisers have expanded free-improvisation, using live electronic and acoustic instruments with computers.

The downtown scene 
In late 1970s New York a group of musicians came together who shared an interest in free improvisation as well as rock, jazz, contemporary classical, world music and pop. They performed at lofts, apartments, basements and venues located predominantly in downtown New York (8BC, Pyramid Club, Environ, Roulette, Studio Henry, Someplace Nice, The Saint, King Tut's Wa Wa Hut and later The Knitting Factory and Tonic) and held regular concerts of free improvisation which featured many of the prominent figures in the scene, including John Zorn, Bill Laswell, George E. Lewis, Fred Frith, Tom Cora, Toshinori Kondo, Wayne Horvitz, Eugene Chadbourne, Zeena Parkins, Anthony Coleman, Polly Bradfield, Ikue Mori, Robert Dick, Ned Rothenberg, Bob Ostertag, Christian Marclay, David Moss, Kramer and many others. They worked with each other, independently and with many of the leading European improvisers of the time, including Derek Bailey, Evan Parker, Han Bennink, Misha Mengelberg, Peter Brötzmann and others. Many of these musicians continue to use improvisation in one form or another in their work.

In the tradition of Derek Bailey's Company Week, monthly Improv Nights have become a tradition at John Zorn's East Village performance space The Stone. Organized as benefits to raise the expenses needed to keep the venue operational, these concerts of improvised music have featured hundreds of musicians from a variety of backgrounds, generations and traditions.

Electronic free improvisation 
Electronic devices such as oscillators, echoes, filters and alarm clocks were an integral part of free improvisation performances by groups such as Kluster at the underground scene at Zodiac Club in Berlin in the late 1960s. For the 1975 jazz-rock concert recording Agharta, Miles Davis and his band employed free improvisation and electronics, particularly guitarist Pete Cosey who improvised sounds by running his guitar through a ring modulator and an EMS Synthi A.

But it was only later that traditional instruments were disbanded altogether in favour of pure electronic free improvisation. In 1984, the Swiss improvisation duo Voice Crack started making use of strictly "cracked everyday electronics". More recently, electronic free improvisation has drawn on Circuit bending, Noise music, DIY-culture and Turntablism, represented by performers such as Otomo Yoshihide, Hemmelig Tempo, Günter Müller, poire z, and many others.

Electroacoustic improvisation 

A recent branch of improvised music is characterized by quiet, slow moving, minimalistic textures and often utilizing laptop computers or unorthodox forms of electronics.

Developing worldwide in the mid-to-late 1990s, with centers in New York, Tokyo and Austria, this style has been called lowercase music or EAI (electroacoustic improvisation), and is represented, for instance, by the American record label Erstwhile Records and the Austrian label Mego.

EAI is often radically different even from established free improvisation. Eyles writes, "One of the problems of describing this music is that it requires a new vocabulary and ways of conveying its sound and impact; such vocabulary does not yet exist – how do you describe the subtle differences between different types of controlled feedback? I've yet to see anyone do it convincingly – hence the use of words like 'shape' and 'texture'!"

Free improvisation on the radio 
The London-based independent radio station Resonance 104.4FM, founded by the London Musicians Collective, frequently broadcasts experimental and free improvised performance works. WNUR 89.3 FM ("Chicago's Sound Experiment") is another source for free improvised music on the radio. Taran's Free Jazz Hour broadcast on Radio-G 101.5 FM, Angers and  101.3 FM, Nantes is entirely dedicated to free jazz and other freely improvised music. A l'improviste, (France musique) French Radio, Listen online the last four broadcasts, only free music every week by Anne Montaron. Based in the neighboring town of Newton, Boston is served with a good amount of free improvisation music from Boston College's non-commercial radio station 90.3 FM WZBC, as part of its vast number of experimental programs.

See also 
 Aesthetics of music
 Avant-garde music
 Experimental music
 Intuitive music
 Musical collective
 Musics (magazine)
 Surrealist music
 List of free improvising musicians and groups

References

External links 
 International Society for Improvised Music
 Signal to Noise magazine A publication on avant-garde jazz and electro-acoustic improvisation
 Carl Bergstrøm-Nielsen: "Experimental Improvisation Practise and Notation 1945–1999: An Annotated Bibliography"

 
Jazz genres
Jazz techniques
Jazz terminology